The Wales women's national basketball team is the national basketball team of Wales and is governed by the Basketball Wales.

See also
Wales national under-17 basketball team
Wales national 3x3 team

References

Basketball in Wales
Basketball teams in Wales
Women's national basketball teams
Basketball